Heinz Eichelbaum (born 13 September 1940) is a German former wrestler. He competed in the men's freestyle +100 kg at the 1976 Summer Olympics.

References

External links
 

1940 births
Living people
German male sport wrestlers
Olympic wrestlers of West Germany
Wrestlers at the 1976 Summer Olympics
Sportspeople from Oberhausen